French Twist may refer to:
 French twist (hairstyle), a common "updo" hair styling technique
 French Twist (film), (French: Gazon maudit), a 1995 French comedy film
 "French Twist" (Gilmore Girls), an episode of the seventh season of the television show Gilmore Girls
 "French Twist" (Miami Vice), an episode of the second season of the television show Miami Vice